Fort Christian is a settlement on the island of Saint Thomas in the United States Virgin Islands.

References

Populated places in Saint Thomas, U.S. Virgin Islands